Romana Calligaris (15 December 1924 – 21 April 2002) was an Italian freestyle swimmer who won 15 national titles between 1947 and 1953. She competed at the 1952 Summer Olympics in the 100 m and 4 × 100 m relay events but failed to reach the finals. 
The pool which hosted the European SC Championships 2005 in Trieste is named after Bruno Bianchi, not Romana Calligaris.

See also
 Italian record progression 100 metres freestyle
 Italian record progression 200 metres freestyle
 Italian record progression 400 metres freestyle

References
  Biography 
  Profile on Agenda diana 
  Profile on sports reference 

Italian female swimmers
Olympic swimmers of Italy
Swimmers at the 1952 Summer Olympics
1924 births
2002 deaths
Italian female freestyle swimmers
People from Mariano del Friuli
20th-century Italian women